The Chrysler Canada Greenway is a 42 km-long rail trail in Essex County, Ontario, Canada, stretching from Oldcastle (near Windsor) to Leamington.

History 
The trail dates back to the late 1980s, when CSX Transportation operated a line, formerly the Canadian branch of the Chesapeake and Ohio Railway from Hiram Walkers distillery in Windsor, Ontario south and east to Leamington, Ontario. This branch line was built by Hiram Walker in 1882, and extended all the way to Kingsville, and later Leamington in 1889.

A portion of the rail line from Windsor to Blenheim was abandoned in 1989, and the rail line was donated to the Essex Region Conservation Authority in 1993, and Chrysler Canada gave a considerable donation to ERCA to convert the rail line to a bike trail. Work was finished on the trail by 1997, and it opened that year to use.  The remainder of the rail line would also be abandoned, and its tracks removed to where they branch from the mainline between Highgate and Muirkirk.

By the year 2001, CN Rail took note of the popularity of the Chrysler Canada Greenway that they donated an additional 26-km spur line from Amherstburg, Ontario to Essex, Ontario, a portion of the rail line operated by the Canada Southern Railway, which was abolished in 1977. (The rails for this spur, were removed in 1995 and the spur leading from Comber to Leamington removed in 2001, eliminating three at-grade railroad crossings on Highway 3). ERCA has stated they intend on converting the new trail from Amhurstburg to Essex as soon as funds become available, and stated this is part of their goal of improving the environment of Essex County, and for linking the communities in Essex County together via trails. There has been no word on if the Leamington-Comber rail corridor will be converted to a trail. ERCA, Ontario Parks and Parks Canada have stated interest on turning the entire abandoned rail corridor from Ruthven to St. Thomas into an extended Chrysler Canada Greenway, linking up with trails in Delhi and Simcoe, providing a single long trail corridor from Windsor to London and Kitchener, and even to Hamilton and Toronto (via the Waterfront Trail).  It is currently unknown if Leamington intends on converting its abandoned rail corridors to trails.

LaSalle, Ontario has also expressed its interest and intentions to link the Windsor Trail and its own LaSalle Trail network to the Chrysler Canada Greenway.

How to travel 
The Greenway allows several different modes of transportation: cycling, walking, horseback riding and cross-country skiing.

Alignment 
The trail starts at the junction with Kings Highway 3, but has signs to cross at the nearby Walker Road due to the dangerously high levels of traffic. The trail also has an unofficial "extension" which continues 2 km straight to its terminus with North Talbot Road. The Greenway also has five "Community Entrances", three of which (Harrow, Kingsville, and Ruthven) are of "service center" standards.

The Greenway is currently all gravel, and it is unknown if there are any plans to pave it in the near future.

Note: Not all exits are initially listed. more will be added as information is received.

Extensions 
Extensions of the trail are planned.

The Municipality of Leamington, Ontario has expressed great interest in converting their abandoned rail lines east of Talbot Road (CR 34) into an extension of the Chrysler Canada Greenway. Currently, bikes and farm tractors have to use dedicated bike lanes along the very-busy Talbot Road, and this is dangerous, due to the high speed limit, trucks, hills, and curves. Currently, the parts east of CR 34 are navigable by bike or foot, but it is not recommended, as the brush is quite thick and it may still be private property.

The nearly all of the right-of-way along the former CN Rail CASO Subdivision from Leamington to a point just east of Ridgetown (via Wheatley, Merlin, and Blenheim) is intact, and able to be converted into a rail trail, and is either in the process of becoming one, or is in the planning stages.

ERCA has expressed its intentions on linking Amherstburg, McGregor, and Essex to the trail network via a 28-km long trail, with an intersection somewhere near McGregor, Ontario. This is already easily done, as ERCA owns the right of way, and a 1-km spur route leads into McGregor from the Greenway.

Aside from money, the insane traffic amounts on Highway 3 (which was scheduled to be twinned starting 2007) would pose a significant obstacle, unless the trail was routed along either an overpass/underpass, or through an intersection/Interchange, such as with Townline Road (County Road 8).

The City of Windsor has also expressed its intentions on linking its bike trail network to the Chrysler Canada Greenway. The most-likely candidate for this would be the Devonwood Bike Trail, which is the farthest-south reaching trail (the closest, with just 3.5 km separating the two), and already connects to an ERCA conservation area (Devonwood Conservation Area).

See also 
 Grand Marais Trail
 Ganatchio Trail
 Little River Extension
 Russell Street Neighbourhood Trail
 Devonwood Bike Trail
 Riverside Drive Vista Project
 Bike Trails in the City of Windsor
 Trans-Canada Trail
 Essex Region Conservation Authority
 Michigan Central Railway
 List of trails in Canada

External links 
 Map of ERCA's outdoor recreation sites

Rail trails in Ontario
Trans Canada Trail
Transport in Essex County, Ontario
Bike paths in Windsor, Ontario
Parks in Windsor, Ontario
Protected areas of Essex County, Ontario